Charles (Chick) Bullock (September 16, 1898 – September 15, 1981) was an American jazz and dance band vocalist, most active in the 1930s. He recorded some 500 tunes over the course of his career. Bullock was mostly associated with the ARC group of labels (Melotone, Perfect, Banner, Oriole, Romeo).  Many of his records were issued under the name "Chick Bullock and his Levee Loungers".

Bullock belonged to select group of mostly freelance vocalists who sang the vocal refrains on hundreds of New York sessions, which included Smith Ballew, Scrappy Lambert, Irving Kaufman, Arthur Fields, and Dick Robertson.  Some of these vocalists were also musicians, but their singing was more often featured.  (All of the above had records also issued under their own name, and in case of Ballew, actually had a working orchestra for a couple of years.)

Bullock, who rarely performed live because his face was disfigured due to an eye disease, was born in Montana to William and Emily Bullock, both of whom were immigrants from England. He began his career in vaudeville and sang in movie palaces. His career as a studio musician took off in the late 1920s, and in the 1930s he sang with musicians such as Duke Ellington, Luis Russell, Cab Calloway, Bunny Berigan, Bill Coleman, Jack Teagarden, Tommy Dorsey, Jimmy Dorsey, Joe Venuti, and Eddie Lang. Bullock's recordings proved so popular that he used pseudonyms for some recordings, including the name Sleepy Hall.

In the early 1940s the recording ban by the American Federation of Musicians essentially ended Bullock's career, and he quit the music business in 1942. He moved to California in 1946 and took up real estate, opening his own company.

Death
He died on September 15, 1981, in California at the age of 82.

References
Footnotes

General references
[ Chick Bullock] at AllMusic

1898 births
1981 deaths
American jazz singers
Vocalion Records artists
20th-century American singers
Perfect Records artists
Banner Records artists
Melotone Records (US) artists